Maryland Heights is a second-ring north suburb of St. Louis, located in St. Louis County, Missouri, United States. The population was 27,472 at the 2010 census. The city was incorporated in 1985. Edwin L. Dirck was appointed the city's first mayor by then County Executive Gene McNary. Mark M. Levin served as City Administrator from August 1985 to 2015.

Geography
Maryland Heights is located at  (38.719551, −90.447467).

Government
The City of Maryland Heights is a third-class statutory city. It is governed by a mayor who serves a four-year term and a city council made up of eight members. The city is divided into four wards.  Two council-people are elected from each ward to serve on a city council for two-year terms.  The city has offered internships in public administration since 1986.

Demographics

2020 census
In 2020, there were 28,284 people living in the city. The racial makeup of the city was 58.5% White, 15.4% African American, 0.4% Native American, 16.4% Asian, 2.8% from other races, and 6.5% from two or more races. Hispanic or Latino of any race were 4.8% of the population.

2010 census
As of the census of 2010, there were 27,472 people, 12,180 households, and 6,766 families living in the city. The racial makeup of the city was 63.2% White, 21.9% African American, 0.2% Native American, 9.8% Asian, 2.3% from other races, and 2.5% from two or more races. Hispanic or Latino of any race were 4.5% of the population.

There were 12,180 households, of which 27.5% had children under the age of 18 living with them, 39.9% were married couples living together, 11.4% had a female householder with no husband present, 4.2% had a male householder with no wife present, and 44.4% were non-families. 35.2% of all households were made up of individuals, and 7.2% had someone living alone who was 65 years of age or older. The average household size was 2.21 and the average family size was 2.90.

The median age in the city was 35 years. 20.3% of residents were under the age of 18; 10.8% were between the ages of 18 and 24; 32% were from 25 to 44; 24.8% were from 45 to 64; and 12.2% were 65 years of age or older. The gender makeup of the city was 48.7% male and 51.3% female.

2000 census
As of the census of 2000, there were 25,756 people, 11,302 households, and 6,419 families living in the city. The racial makeup of the city was 85.35% White, 5.58% African American, 0.20% Native American, 7.11% Asian, 0.03% Pacific Islander, 0.71% from other races, and 1.02% from two or more races. Hispanic or Latino of any race were 2.33% of the population.

There were 11,302 households, out of which 25.8% had children under the age of 18 living with them, 44.2% were married couples living together, 9.5% had a female householder with no husband present, and 43.2% were non-families. 33.8% of all households were made up of individuals, and 5.5% had someone living alone who was 65 years of age or older. The average household size was 2.25 and the average family size was 2.94.

In the city, the population was spread out, with 21.5% under the age of 18, 9.8% from 18 to 24, 37.2% from 25 to 44, 22.0% from 45 to 64, and 9.5% who were 65 years of age or older. The median age was 34 years. For every 100 females, there were 97.7 males. For every 100 females age 18 and over, there were 96.1 males.

The median income for a household in the city was $48,689, and the median income for a family was $58,487. Males had a median income of $40,700 versus $30,613 for females. The per capita income for the city was $24,918. About 3.8% of families and 5.3% of the population were below the poverty line, including 4.6% of those under age 18 and 8.2% of those age 65 or over.

Education

Maryland Heights is served by Parkway and Pattonville public school districts.

Healthcare
SSM Health DePaul Hospital, a 478-bed, full-service hospital, is located nearby in Bridgeton.

Economy
Edward Jones Investments operates its North Campus office in Maryland Heights.

At one time, Express Scripts had its headquarters in Maryland Heights. Express Scripts built a new headquarters on the grounds of the University of Missouri-St. Louis in 2007.

Central Midland Railway (CMR), a division of Progressive Rail Inc. of Minnesota, provides regular freight rail service to several businesses located in Maryland Heights.  CMR operates the far eastern segment of the former Chicago, Rock Island and Pacific Railway's St. Louis to Kansas City main line that was constructed in 1870. The active portion of the former CRI&P line runs from the north side of St. Louis, where it connects with the Terminal Railroad Association of St. Louis and Union Pacific Railroad, and now terminates in Union.

Hollywood Casino St. Louis is on the western edge of the city.

World Wide Technology is based in Maryland Heights.

Bayer Crop Science has a campus in nearby Creve Coeur.

Top employers
According to the city's 2018 Comprehensive Annual Financial Report, the top employers in the city are:

Attractions, parks and recreation
The city of Maryland Heights operates four parks as well as Aquaport, a waterpark; Sportport, a multi-use recreational facility; and Dogport, a park for dogs.

Aquaport
Aquaport is operated by Maryland Heights as a municipal water park for citizens of Maryland Heights and Creve Coeur. It opened in 1999.

Centene Community Ice Center
The Centene Community Ice Center, which opened in 2019, features three indoor ice rinks and a covered outdoor rinks.  It is a practice facility for the St. Louis Blues, as well as home ice for Lindenwood University's men's and women's ice hockey teams.

Creve Coeur County Park
Creve Coeur Lake Memorial Park is operated by St. Louis County and was a summer resort in the early 1900s. It features a  lake as well as the picturesque "Dripping Springs" waterfall. It was St. Louis County's first park.

Historic Aircraft Restoration Museum
Historic Aircraft Restoration Museum is located at the Creve Coeur Airport and has a large collection of 1920s and 1930s aircraft.

Vago Community Park
Vago Park is a  park located at the intersection of Fee Fee Road and Midland Avenue. It features three playgrounds, a splash pad play area, a paved walking trail, a sand volleyball court, three pavilions, a gazebo and picnic areas outfitted with barbecue grills. Visitors will want to be sure to note the "Veterans Memorial Walk," a sidewalk made of bricks imprinted with the names of Maryland Heights residents who have served in the Armed Forces of the United States.

Gerald A. Eise Memorial Park
Eise Park is located at the intersection of Glenview Drive and Bourbon Street, near Rose Acres Elementary School. It contains one pavilion seating about 25 people, a playground, a splash pad play area, several picnic tables with barbecue grills, a walking path, a basketball slab, and restrooms.

Quiet Hollow Park
Quiet Hollow Park is a small park at the intersection of Marine Avenue and McKelvey Road.

Parkwood Park
Parkwood Park is located on 3145 Parkwood Lane, next to Parkwood Elementary School. It features a  paved walking trail with fitness stations, a playground, green space, restrooms and a small parking lot.

Westport Plaza

Westport Plaza is a 700,000+ square foot development featuring dining, entertainment venues, businesses and radio stations.  Westport is located at the intersection of Page Avenue and I-270 in the northwest area of St. Louis County.

Hollywood Casino
Maryland Heights is home to St. Louis County's first casino, Hollywood Casino St. Louis, which opened in 1997 in the Riverport area as Harrah's.

Hollywood Casino Amphitheater
The Hollywood Casino Amphitheater is a 7,000-seat outdoor concert venue, with lawn seating for another 13,000, making it a 20,000 person capacity venue.

Zion Lutheran Church
Zion Lutheran Church is one of the earliest parts of the community which became Maryland Heights. It started as a grade school on October 13, 1869, and it became a congregation of the Lutheran Church–Missouri Synod on January 1, 1883.

References

External links
 City of Maryland Heights official website
 Maryland Heights Convention and Visitors Bureau

Cities in St. Louis County, Missouri
Cities in Missouri
Populated places established in 1985
1985 establishments in Missouri